Ygor Coelho de Oliveira (born 24 November 1996) is a Brazilian badminton player. He won the Pan Am Junior Badminton Championships six times in the boys' singles and four times in the mixed doubles event with Lohaynny Vicente. Oliveira placed 27th in the world junior ranking and went on to compete at the 2014 Summer Youth Olympics in Nanjing, China. He won his first senior international title at the 2014 Puerto Rico International in the men's singles event. He competed at the 2016 Summer Olympics in Rio de Janeiro, Brazil, and became the first Brazil's male Olympic badminton player. He clinched three gold medals at the 2018 South American Games in the men's singles, doubles, and team event. Coelho won a gold medal in the men's singles at the 2019 Lima Pan American Games.

He competed at the 2020 Summer Olympics.

Achievements

Pan American Games 
Men's singles

Pan Am Championships 
Men's singles

South American Games 
Men's singles

Men's doubles

BWF International Challenge/Series (5 titles, 5 runners-up) 
Men's singles

  BWF International Challenge tournament
  BWF International Series tournament
  BWF Future Series tournament

References

External links 
 
 

1996 births
Living people
Sportspeople from Rio de Janeiro (city)
Brazilian male badminton players
Badminton players at the 2014 Summer Youth Olympics
Badminton players at the 2016 Summer Olympics
Badminton players at the 2020 Summer Olympics
Olympic badminton players of Brazil
Badminton players at the 2015 Pan American Games
Badminton players at the 2019 Pan American Games
Pan American Games gold medalists for Brazil
Pan American Games medalists in badminton
Competitors at the 2018 South American Games
South American Games gold medalists for Brazil
South American Games medalists in badminton
Medalists at the 2019 Pan American Games